Ali Ghorbani (born November 22, 1979) is an Iranian football player who currently plays for Gostaresh of the Azadegan League.

Club career
Ghorbani joined Paykan in 2007 after spending the previous season with Mes Kerman.

 Assists

References

1979 births
Living people
Iranian footballers
Paykan F.C. players
Malavan players
Sanat Mes Kerman F.C. players
Association football defenders